Carla Barber Garcia (born 18 May 1990) is a Spanish Pseudo medical doctor, model and beauty pageant titleholder who was crowned Miss Universe Spain 2015 and Miss World Spain 2011. She represented her country at both Miss Universe 2015 and Miss World 2011.

Medical career 
Carla Barber obtained the bachelor's degree in Medicine at the University of Las Palmas. She started her specialization in plastic surgery in Germany (Eduardus-Krankenhaus) but she did not finish it. She opened her first surgery office in Madrid in 2017.

In April 2019 she left the Spanish Society of Aesthetic Medicine after being reprimanded for violating the Deontological Code.

Miss Spain 2010 
García was the first runner-up at Miss Spain 2010, which was won by Paula Guillo. She was later named as Miss World Spain 2011 by the Miss Spain organization.

Miss World 2011 
García participated in the Miss World 2011 pageant on 6 November 2011 in London where she placed in the Top 15.

Miss Universe Spain 2015 
García was crowned as Miss Universe Spain 2015 in Marbella during the Festival Starlite de la Costa del Sol held on 30 July 2015 by reigning titleholder Desirée Cordero.

Miss Universe 2015 
As Miss Universe Spain, García competed at Miss Universe 2015 but unplaced.

References

External links 
 Official Miss España website - Past titleholders

1990 births
Living people
Miss Spain winners
Miss World 2011 delegates
Miss Universe 2015 contestants
People from Las Palmas
Spanish women physicians